UMA Today is an international consortium of companies joined together to lead the adoption of 3GPP UMA technology around the world.

UMA is the commercial name for the global 3GPP Generic Access Network (GAN) standard for fixed-mobile convergence (FMC). UMA enables secure, scalable access to mobile voice, data and IMS services over broadband IP access networks. By deploying UMA, mobile operators can deliver a number of compelling FMC services. The most well-known applications of UMA include dual-mode Wi-Fi/cellular phones. Leading operators around the world have embraced UMA as the foundation for their FMC strategies, including France Telecom/Orange, T-Mobile (USA), Rogers Wireless, TeliaSonera and Cincinnati Bell.

UMA Today publishes the UMA Today Magazine hosts Webinars, sends news alerts to a subscription list and is involved in other industry activity to promote UMA technology.  In addition, UMA Today co-sponsored the UMA Innovation Awards with Orange/France Telecom in 2008 and 2009. 

As of October 2010, T-Mobile USA announced it was using Kineto Wireless Smart Wi-Fi technology as the enabling technology for its Wi-Fi Calling service offer.

External links 
 UMAToday 
 UMA Today blog. 
 BlackBerry Curve 8320 Wins UMA Innovation Award, Mobile Shop, Feb. 2009
 Orange and UMA Today Announce Second Annual UMA Innovation Awards
 Orange and UMA Today Announce Winners of Second Annual UMA Innovation Awards, TMCNet, Feb. 2009 

Technology trade associations
Wi-Fi
VoIP organizations